Jean-Marie Abgrall (born 12 April 1950) is a French psychiatrist, criminologist, specialist in forensic medicine, cult consultant, graduate in criminal law and anti-cultist. He has been an expert witness.

Various groups, including the Aumism movement and the Belgian Raelian Movement, have opposed Abgrall.

Dick Anthony and Thomas Robbins have written that in their view, Abgrall's theories of brainwashing are pseudoscientific, and so unsuitable for use as a basis for legal judgments in cases involving cult membership. They qualify Abgrall as the "leading psychiatric consultant to government agencies and legislative bodies concerned with controlling and suppressing non-traditional religions", noting that Abgrall's brainwashing theory has served as the primary psychiatric rationale for anti-cult laws, governmental rulings, and  legal cases brought against alleged cults in Europe. Abgrall has also influenced former communist countries through the dissemination of official governmental reports from France and Belgium that he helped produce.

In 1996, the French government set up an observatory body to investigate cults and sects, the Parliamentary Commission on Cults in France. Abgrall was a "key actor" in these investigations, preparing official reports in France and Belgium, and was an active anti-cult movement spokesperson in the European media, in particular television. The Commission issued a report which listed 189 movements. This effective "black list" was widely publicized and misused by the media and some state bodies. The rights of these groups such as freedom of assembly and expression was interfered with as a result.

According to Dick Anthony, Abgrall emerged as a key "cult expert" in France, because he was the first psychiatrist in France willing to embrace brainwashing theories. He describes Abgrall's theories as "essentially identical to the pseudoscientific theory that was developed first by the American CIA as a propaganda device to combat communism, and second as an ideological device for use by the American anti-cult movement to rationalize efforts at persecution and control of minority religious groups".

References 

Sources
 Soul Snatchers: The Mechanics of Cults, by Jean-Marie Abgrall, Alice Seberry (Translator), December 1999, 296 pages, Algora Publishing, paperback
 Healing Or Stealing?: Medical Charlatans in the New Age, Algora Pub., 2007, 244 pages, 

1950 births
Living people
French psychiatrists
Researchers of new religious movements and cults
Critics of The Family International
French people of Breton descent
Brainwashing theory proponents